The Portrait of Isabella of Portugal is an oil-on-oak Early Netherlandish painting of Isabella of Portugal, Duchess of Burgundy, the third wife of Philip the Good. Executed around 1450, the painting had been attributed to Rogier van der Weyden, but is now believed to be from a member of his workshop.

Isabella's expression is slightly mocking. She is dressed in an ornately decorated red and gold brocade dress, tightly pulled below at her waist by a green sash, although the artist did not match the brocade pattern on the sleeves. The high butterfly hennin and the rings on her fingers denote nobility. The duchess's fingers are elongated, typical of van der Weyden's style, yet this is believed to be a copy of an original van der Weyden portrait which is now lost.

On the upper right is the inscription PERSICA SIBYLLA IA, which suggests it may have been one of a series of portraits depicting sibyls, an identity which contrasts with Isabella's. The inscription and brown faux wood background are later additions.
 
It is unknown who owned the painting before 1629. It may have belonged to Alexandre d'Arenberg, Duke of Croy and Prince of Chimay, from the end about 1590 to 1629. It was bought by a dealer in 1883 and later sold to Adolph Carl de Rothschild a few years later; when he died in 1900, his son, Baron Maurice de Rothschild inherited the painting, and sold it to John D. Rockefeller in 1927. It stayed in the Rockefeller family until the Getty Center bought it in 1978.

References

Further reading
Campbell, Lorne and Yvonne Szafran. "The Portrait of Isabella of Portugal, Duchess of Burgundy, in the J. Paul Getty Museum". The Burlington Magazine, Vol. 146, No. 1212 (Mar., 2004), pp. 148–157

Paintings by Rogier van der Weyden
Isabella of Portugal
Isabella of Portugal
Philip the Good (Duke of Burgundy)
Isabella of Portugal
1450s paintings
Isabella of Portugal
15th-century fashion
Isabella of Portugal
Paintings in the collection of the J. Paul Getty Museum